The 1960 All-Ireland Junior Hurling Championship was the 39th staging of the All-Ireland Junior Championship since its establishment by the Gaelic Athletic Association in 1912.

London entered the championship as the defending champions.

The All-Ireland final replay was played on 23 October 1960 at Croke Park in Dublin, between London and Carlow, in what was their first ever meeting in the final. London won the match by 4–08 to 2–11 to claim their fourth championship title overall and a second title in succession.

Results

All-Ireland Junior Hurling Championship

All-Ireland semi-finals

All-Ireland home final

All-Ireland final

All-Ireland final replay

References

Junior
All-Ireland Junior Hurling Championship